KOC is an abbreviation that can mean:
 Kings of Convenience, a Norwegian indie musical group
 Knights of Columbus, a Roman Catholic fraternal order
 Kodiak College, a college located in Kodiak, Alaska
 Kuwait Oil Company, one of the biggest oil companies in the world
 Korean Olympic Committee, represents South Korea in handling international affairs related to the Olympic Movement
 "Knights of Cydonia", a song by the British band Muse
 Kingdom of Comfort, a Delirious? album
 Kingdoms of Camelot, an online game by Kabam 
 Kevin O'Connell, an American football coach and former player 

In Chemistry:
 Koc (Soil Organic Carbon-Water Partitioning Coefficient), the ratio of the adsorbed organic analyte to the dissolved

See also
 Koç, a Turkish name